Eduard Büsser (15 September 1899 – 9 August 1949) was a Swiss painter. His work was part of the painting event in the art competition at the 1928 Summer Olympics.

References

1899 births
1949 deaths
20th-century Swiss painters
Swiss male painters
Olympic competitors in art competitions
20th-century Swiss male artists